The Ganabhaban (lit. People's House) is the official residence of the Prime Minister of Bangladesh, which is located on the north corner of the National Parliament House in Sher-e-Bangla Nagar, Dhaka. After independence, Sheikh Mujibur Rahman worked at Bangabhaban, which is located on Minto Road.

History 
Prime Minister Sheikh Hasina moved in to the Ganabhaban 6 March 2010 more than a year after she had been elected. Prime Minister Sheikh Hasina moved from Sudha Sadan to Jamuna State Guest House in February 2009 on advice of intelligence agencies and the Special Security Force. She was staying Jamuna State Guest House while the Ganabhaban was being renovated. She hosted the wedding of three women who were victims of the 2010 Dhaka fire in Nimtoli at the Ganabhaban. U Pha Thann, Ambassador of Myanmar to Bangladesh, visited Prime Minister Sheikh Hasina and discussed the Rohingya refugees in Bangladesh.

In October 2013, Prime Minister Sheikh Hasina invited former Prime Minister Khaleda Zia to the Ganabhaban to discuss the 2014 national elections.

A constable of the Special Security and Protection Battalion, guarding ganabhaban, was shot accidentally by a colleague in February 2018.

Politicians of Awami League and affiliated bodies have special passes to access the Ganabhaban. In September 2019, the special passes of the President and general secretary of Bangladesh Chhatra League.

Bangladesh police stopped victims of 2012 Dhaka garment factory fire from reaching the Ganabhaban in November 2020.

In April 2022, Sohel Taj announced plans to march to Ganabhaban.

Function

Unlike many other countries, it does not house the Prime Minister's Office, which is located at Tejgaon in Dhaka city and considered as a ministry of the government and among other duties provides clerical, security, and other support to the prime minister, governs intelligence affairs and NGOs, and arranges protocol and ceremonies.

The prime minister exchanges Eid greetings with people including party leaders, professionals, senior civil and military officials judges and diplomats at Gana Bhaban. On every Eid Day the gate of the Gono Bhaban is opened for visitors at 9:00am when people from all walks of life start coming after their Eid prayers and wait in queue to meet the prime minister.

Location
It is on the north west corner of the Mirpur Road and Lake Road crossing and is a five-minute walk from the Jatiya Sangsad Bhaban. The area is one of the higher security zones of Dhaka.
Both the Prime Minister's Office and the Parliament of Bangladesh are a little way off Ganabhaban.

The government has assigned Gana Bhaban to Sheikh Hasina, the current Prime Minister, under the security act for family members of Sheikh Mujibur Rahman. The law was passed by parliament on 13 October 2009, for state security for Sheikh Mujibur Rahman's immediate family members.

References

Prime ministerial residences
Official residences in Bangladesh